Alessandro Zampedri (born 3 October 1969 in Brescia) is an Italian race car driver. He started three Indianapolis 500s (1995, 1996, and 1997).

Racing career 
Zampedri was seriously injured in the 1996 Indianapolis 500, suffering severe foot and leg injuries on the last lap of the race.  While running fourth, Zampedri was collected in a crash with Roberto Guerrero and Eliseo Salazar.  Zampedri's car became airborne and crashed into the fence at the head of the main straightaway. The car came to rest near the pit entry. A portion of Zampedri's left foot and three toes had to be amputated as a result of the accident.

He returned to Indianapolis in 1997, but he struggled, due to engine failure during the formation laps.

In 1999, he returned to racing in Europe in the Porsche Supercup and became champion in 2005, taking his only victory in the series at Circuit de Catalunya. He was the first Italian to win the Porsche Championship.

Racing record

Complete International Formula 3000 results
(key) (Races in bold indicate pole position) (Races 
in italics indicate fastest lap)

American Open Wheel
(key)

CART

IndyCar Series

Partial Porsche Supercup results
(key) (Races in bold indicate pole position) (Races in italics indicate fastest lap)

† — Did not finish the race, but was classified as he completed over 90% of the race distance.

‡ — Not eligible for points.

See also
 The Bowery House

References

Official website

1969 births
Living people
Italian racing drivers
Champ Car drivers
Indianapolis 500 drivers
IndyCar Series drivers
International Formula 3000 drivers
Trans-Am Series drivers
Porsche Supercup drivers
Sportspeople from Brescia
Walter Lechner Racing drivers
Nordic Racing drivers
EuroInternational drivers
Dale Coyne Racing drivers
TOM'S drivers